The Mansudae Assembly Hall is the seat of the Supreme People's Assembly,  the unicameral legislature of North Korea. It is located in the North Korean capital of Pyongyang and sits adjacent to the Korean Revolution Museum. Before the Korean War the territory where the building is situated was the location of the former Pyongyang Women’s Prison.

The building is based on Soviet architectural influences with some Korean elements.

On 9 September 2022, a concert was held in the grounds of Mansudae Assembly Hall commemorating the 74th Day of the Foundation of the Republic which was broadcast live on DPRK state television.

References

External links

Supreme People's Assembly
Buildings and structures in Pyongyang
Government of North Korea
Seats of national legislatures
1984 establishments in North Korea
Government buildings completed in 1984
20th-century architecture in North Korea